DIGITAL Command Language (DCL) is the standard command language adopted by many of the operating systems created by Digital Equipment Corporation. DCL had its roots in IAS, TOPS-20, and RT-11 and was implemented as a standard across most of Digital's operating systems, notably RSX-11 and RSTS/E, but took its most powerful form in VAX/VMS (later OpenVMS). DCL continues to be developed by VSI as part of OpenVMS.

Written when the programming language Fortran was in heavy use, DCL is a scripting language supporting several data types, including strings, integers, bit arrays, arrays and booleans, but not floating point numbers. Access to OpenVMS system services (kernel API) is through lexical functions, which perform the same as their compiled language counterparts and allow scripts to get information on system state. DCL includes IF-THEN-ELSE, access to all the Record Management Services (RMS) file types including stream, indexed, and sequential, but unfortunately lacks a DO-WHILE or other looping construct, requiring users to make do with IF and GOTO-label statements instead.

DCL is available for other operating systems as well, including 
 VCL and VX/DCL for Unix, 
 VCL for MS-DOS, OS/2 and Windows, 
 PC-DCL and Open DCL for Windows/Linux
 and Accelr8 DCL Lite for Windows.

DCL is the basis of the XLNT language, implemented on Windows by an interpreter-IDE-WSH engine combination with CGI capabilities distributed by Advanced System Concepts Inc. from 1997.

Command line parser
For the OpenVMS implementation, the command line parser is a runtime library that can be compiled into user applications and therefore gives a consistent command line interface for both OS supplied commands and user written commands. The command line must start with a verb and is then followed by up to 8 parameters (arguments) and/or qualifiers (switches in Unix terminology) which begin with a '/' character.  Unlike Unix (but similar to DOS), a space is not required before the '/'.  Qualifiers can be position independent (occurring anywhere on the command line) or position dependent, in which case the qualifier affects the parameter it appears after.  Most qualifiers are position independent. Qualifiers may also be assigned values or a series of values. Only the first most significant part of the verb and qualifier name is required. Parameters can be integers or alphanumeric text.

An example OS command may look like:
    set audit /alarm /enable=(authorization, breakin=all)
    show device /files $1$DGA1424:
The second show command could also be typed as:
    sho dev $1$DGA1424:/fil

While DCL documentation usually shows all DCL commands in uppercase, DCL commands are case-insensitive and may be typed in upper-, lower-, or mixed-case.

Some implementations such as OpenVMS used a minimum uniqueness scheme in allowing commands to be shortened while others such as RSX-11 allowed commands to be abbreviated to a minimum of three characters.

Unlike other systems which use paths for locating commands, DCL requires commands to be defined explicitly, either via CLD (Command Language Definition) definitions or a foreign symbol.  Most OpenVMS-native commands are defined via CLD files; these are compiled by the CDU, the Command Definition Utility, and added to a DCL 'table' --  by default, although processes are free to use their own tables—and can then be invoked by the user.  For example, defining a command FOO that accepts the option "/BAR" and is implemented by the image  could be done with a CLD file similar to:
 DEFINE VERB FOO
    IMAGE "SYS$SYSEXE:FOO.EXE"
    QUALIFIER BAR
The user can then type "", or "", and the FOO program will be invoked.  The command definition language supports many types of options, for example dates and file specifications, and allows a qualifier to change the image invoked—for example "", to create a file, vs. "" to create a directory.

The other (simpler, but less flexible) method to define commands is via foreign commands.  This is more akin to the Unix method of invoking programs.  By giving the command:
 foo :== $sys$sysexe:foo.exe
the command 'FOO' will invoke FOO.EXE, and supply any additional arguments literally to the program, for example, "".  This method is generally used for programs ported from Unix and other non-native systems; for C programs using argc and argv command syntax.

Versions of OpenVMS DCL starting with V6.2 support the  logical name for establishing Unix-style command paths.  This mechanism is known as an Automatic Foreign Command.   allows a list of directories to be specified, and these directories are then searched for DCL command procedures (command.COM) and then for executable images (command.EXE) with filenames that match the command that was input by the user.  Like traditional foreign commands, automatic foreign commands also allow Unix-style command input.

Scripting
DCL scripts look much like any other scripting language, with some exceptions.  All DCL verbs in a script are preceded with a $ symbol; other lines are considered to be input to the previous command. For example, to use the TYPE command to print a paragraph onto the screen, one might use a script similar to:
$ TYPE SYS$INPUT:
This is an example of using the TYPE verb
in the DCL language.
$ EXIT

Indirect variable referencing
It is possible to build arrays in DCL that are referenced through translated symbols. This allows the programmer to build arbitrarily sized data structures using the data itself as an indexing function. 
$ i = 1
$ variable'i' = "blue"
$ i = 2 
$ variable'i' = "green"
$ j = 1
$ color = variable'j'
$ rainbow'color' = "red"
$ color = variable'i'
$ rainbow'color' = "yellow"

Commands

The following is a list of DCL commands for common computing tasks that are supported by the OpenVMS command-line interface.

 COPY
 COPY/FTP
 CREATE
 DELETE
 DIRECTORY
 EDIT
 LOGOUT
 PRINT
 RENAME
 SET
 SHOW
 TYPE

Lexical functions
Lexical functions provide string functions and access to VMS-maintained data.

Some Lexicals are:
   extract a substring
   obtain date/time info, e.g. 
 
   for  would return 
   searches for a file, returns a null ("") if not found
 
   it's a privilege to have access to this.

See also
Comparison of command shells

References

Further reading

External links
VSI OpenVMS DCL Dictionary: A-M
VSI OpenVMS DCL Dictionary: N-Z
OpenVMS.org's DCL archive

Command shells
OpenVMS
OpenVMS software
Scripting languages